Quiet Riot is the self-titled debut studio album by the American heavy metal band Quiet Riot, it was released exclusively in Japan on 2 March 1978. 

The album features guitarist Randy Rhoads, who would later gain recognition for performing on Ozzy Osbourne's first two solo albums.

Analyzing it decades later, music critic Martin Popoff said that the album was more "glam pop" than hard rock or glam rock.

The song "Back to the Coast" was originally written by Rhoads and his brother Kelle when they were teenagers. It was originally called "West Coast Tryouts". 

"Back to the Coast" was re-recorded by Kelle Rhoads for his 1985 Cheap Talkin' Romance EP, which features Kelly Garni on bass and Steve Sunnarborg, a student of Randy Rhoads and winner of the Randy Rhoads Memorial Scholarship at CSUN, on guitar.

Track listing

Personnel

Quiet Riot
Kevin DuBrow – lead vocals
Randy Rhoads – lead & rhythm guitars
Kelly Garni – bass guitar
Drew Forsyth – drums

References

1978 debut albums
Quiet Riot albums
Randy Rhoads